Cotyachryson inspergatus is a species of longhorn beetle in the Cerambycinae subfamily. It was described by Faimaire and Germain in 1898. It is known from Chile.

References

Achrysonini
Beetles described in 1898
Endemic fauna of Chile